Toffler is a surname. Notable people with the surname include:

 Alvin Toffler (1928–2016), American writer and futurist
 Larry Toffler (born 1963), American game show host and actor
 Van Toffler (born 1958), American television executive